Lusitanian (so named after the Lusitani or Lusitanians) was an Indo-European Paleohispanic language. There has been support for either a connection with the ancient Italic languages or Celtic languages. It is known from only six sizeable inscriptions, dated from circa 1 CE, and numerous names of places (toponyms) and of gods (theonyms). The language was spoken in the territory inhabited by Lusitanian tribes, from the Douro to the Tagus rivers, territory that today falls in central Portugal and western Spain.

Classification and related languages

Celtic 
Scholars like Untermann have identified toponymic and anthroponymic radicals which are clearly linked to Celtic materials: briga ‘hill, fortification’, bormano ‘thermal’ (Cf. theonym Bormo), karno ‘cairn’, krouk ‘hillock, mound’, crougia ‘monument, stone altar’, etc. Others, like Anderson, after inscriptional materials of Lusitania, and Gallaecia have been under closer scrutiny, with the results suggesting albeit somewhat indirectly; believe that Lusitanian and Gallaecian formed a fairly homogeneous linguistic group displaying closely affiliated inscriptions. Indigenous divine names in Portugal and Galicia frequently revolve around the gods or goddesses Bandu, Bandi, Cossu, Nabia and Reve:
Bandei Brialcacui, (Beira-Baixa)
Coso Udaviniago, (A Coruña)
Cosiovi Ascanno, (Asturias)
deo domeno Cusu Neneoeco, (Douro)
Reo Paramaeco, (Lugo)
Reve Laraucu, (Ourense)
Reve Langanidaeigui, (Beira-Baixa)

The Lusitanian and Gallaecian divine name Lucubos, for example, also occurs outside the peninsula, in the plural, in Celtic Helvetia, where the nominative form is Lugoves. Lug was also an Irish god, and the ancient name of Lyon was Lug dumum and may have a connection with the Lusitanian and Gallaecian word, suggesting therefore a north-western Iberian sprachbund with Lusitanian as a dialect, not a language isolate. Prominent linguists such as Ellis Evans believe that Gallaecian-Lusitanian were one same language (not separate languages) of the “P” Celtic variant.

While chronology, migrations and diffusion of Hispanic Indo-European peoples are still far from clear, it has been argued there is a case for assuming a shared Celtic dialect for ancient Portugal and Galicia-Asturias. Linguistic similarities between these Western Iberian Indo-Europeans, the Celtiberians, the  Gauls and the Celtic peoples of Great Britain indicate an affiliation in vocabulary and linguistic structure.

Furthermore, scholars such as Koch say there is no unambiguous example of the reflexes of the Indo-European syllabic resonants  and the voiced aspirate stops . Additionally, names in the inscriptions can be read as undoubtedly Celtic, such as AMBATVS, CAELOBRIGOI and VENDICVS. Dagmar Wodtko argues that it is hard to identify Lusitanian personal or place-names that are actually not Celtic. These arguments contradict the hypothesis that the p- in PORCOM alone excludes Lusitanian from the Celtic group of pre-Roman languages of Europe and that it can be classed as a Celtic dialect but one that preserved Indo-European  (or possibly an already phonetically weakened , written P as an archaism). This is based largely on numerous Celtic personal, deity, and place names.

Bua Carballo suggests that pairings on different inscriptions such as Proeneiaeco and Proinei versus Broeneiae, and Lapoena versus Laboena, may cast doubt on the presence of a P sound in Lusitanian.

Para-Celtic 
Some scholars have proposed that it may be a para-Celtic language, which evolved alongside Celtic or formed a dialect continuum or sprachbund with Tartessian and Gallaecian. This is tied to a theory of an Iberian origin for the Celtic languages. It is also possible that the Q-Celtic languages alone, including Goidelic, originated in western Iberia (a theory that was first put forward by Welsh historian Edward Lhuyd in 1707) or shared a common linguistic ancestor with Lusitanian.

Secondary evidence for this hypothesis has been found in research by biological scientists, who have identified (firstly) deep-rooted similarities in human DNA found precisely in both the former Lusitania and Ireland and (secondly) the so-called "Lusitanian distribution" of animals and plants unique to western Iberia and Ireland. Both of these phenomena are now generally believed to have resulted from human emigration from Iberia to Ireland during the late Paleolithic or early Mesolithic eras.

Non-Celtic 

In general, philologists consider Lusitanian an Indo-European language of a western language-group classification but not Celtic.

Villar and Pedrero (2001) connect Lusitanian with ancient Ligurian. They base their findings on parallels in the names of deities and some lexical items (e.g., the similarity of Umbrian gomia and Lusitanian comaiam), and some grammatical elements. However, this raises more questions about the relation of the Lusitanian language with Celtic because ancient Ligurian is considered Celtic by some.

Krzysztof (1999) is highly critical of the name-correspondences of Lusitanian and Celtic by Anderson (1985) and Untermann (1987), describing them as "unproductive" and agrees with Karl Horst Schmidt that they are insufficient proof of a genetic relationship because they could have come from language contact [with Celtic]. He concludes that Lusitanian is an Indo-European language, likely of a western but non-Celtic branch, as it differs from Celtic speech by some phonological phenomena, e.g. in Lusitanian Indo-European *p is preserved but Indo-European *d is changed into r; Common Celtic, on the contrary, retains Indo-European *d and loses *p.

Jordán Colera (2007) does not consider Lusitanian or more broadly Gallo-Lusitanian, as a Celtic corpus, although he claims it has some Celtic linguistic features.

According to Prósper (1999), Lusitanian cannot be considered a Celtic language under existing definitions of linguistic celticity because, along with other non-Celtic characteristics she describes, it retains Indo-European *p in positions where Celtic languages would not, specifically in PORCOM 'pig' and PORGOM. More recently, Prósper (2021) has confirmed her earlier readings of inscriptions with the help of a newly discovered inscription from Plasencia, showing clearly that the morphs of the dative and locative endings definitely separates Lusitanian from Celtic and approaches it to Italic.

Prósper (1999) argues that Lusitanian predates the arrival of Celtic in the Iberian Peninsula and points out that it retains elements of Old European, making its origins possibly even older. This provides some support to the proposals of Mallory and Koch et al., who have postulated that the ancient Lusitanians originated from either Proto-Italic or Proto-Celtic speaking populations who spread from Central Europe into Western Europe after new Yamnaya migrations into the Danube valley, while Proto-Germanic and Proto-Balto-Slavic may have developed east of the Carpathian Mountains, in present-day Ukraine, moving north and spreading with the Corded Ware culture in Middle Europe (third millennium BCE). Alternatively, a European branch of Indo-European dialects, termed "North-west Indo-European" and associated with the Beaker culture, may have been ancestral to not only Italic and Celtic but also Germanic and Balto-Slavic.

Luján (2019) follows a similar line of thought but places the origin of Lusitanian even earlier. He argues that the evidence shows that Lusitanian must have diverged from the other western Indo-European dialects before the kernel of what would then evolve into the Italic and Celtic language families had formed. This points to Lusitanian being so ancient that it predates both the Celtic and Italic linguistic groups. Contact with subsequent Celtic migrations into the Iberian Peninsula are likely to have led to the linguistic assimilation of the Celtic elements found in the language.

Geographical distribution

Inscriptions have been found Cabeço das Fráguas (in Guarda), in Moledo (Viseu), in Arroyo de la Luz (in Cáceres) and most recently in Ribeira da Venda. Taking into account Lusitanian theonyms, anthroponyms and toponyms, the Lusitanian sphere would include modern northern Portugal and adjacent areas in southern Galicia, with the centre in Serra da Estrela.

The most famous inscriptions are those from Cabeço das Fráguas and Lamas de Moledo in Portugal and Arroyo de la Luz in Spain. Ribeira da Venda is the most recently discovered (2008).

A bilingual Lusitanian–Latin votive inscription is reported to attest the ancient name of Portuguese city of Viseu: Vissaîegobor.

Writing system
All the known inscriptions are written in the Latin alphabet, which was borrowed by bilingual Lusitanians, who were literate in Latin,  to write Lusitanian since Lusitanian had no writing system of its own. It is difficult to determine if the letters have a different pronunciation than the Latin values but the frequent alternations of c with g (porcom vs. porgom) and t with d (ifadem vs. ifate), and the frequent loss of g between vowels, points to a lenis pronunciation compared to Latin.

Inscriptions

Lamas de Moledo:Hübner, E. (ed.) Corpus Inscriptionum Latinarum vol. II, Supplementum. Berlin: G. Reimer (1892)Cabeço das Fráguas:

Translation:Arroyo de la Luz (I & II):Arroyo de la Luz (III):Ribeira da Venda:

See also
Celtiberian language
Gallaecian language
Ligurian (ancient)
Paleo-Iberian languages

Notes

Further reading

General studies
 .
 Anthony, David W. (2007): The Horse, the Wheel, and Language. Princeton, NJ. pp. 360–380.
 .
 .
 .
 Mallory, J.P. (2016): Archaeology and language shift in Atlantic Europe, in Celtic from the West 3, eds Koch, J.T. & Cunliffe, B.. Oxford: Oxbow, pp. 387–406.
 .
 
 .

Studies on epigraphy
 . 
 
 Cardim, José, y Hugo Pires (2021). «Sobre La Fijación Textual De Las Inscripciones Lusitanas De Lamas De Moledo, Cabeço Das Fráguas Y Arronches: La Contribución Del "Modelo De Residuo Morfológico" (MRM), Resultados Y Principales Consecuencias Interpretativa»s. In: Palaeohispanica. Revista Sobre Lenguas Y Culturas De La Hispania Antigua 21 (diciembre), 301-52. https://doi.org/10.36707/palaeohispanica.v21i0.416.
 .
 Prósper, Blanca Maria.The Lusitanian oblique cases revisted: New light on the dative endings. In: Curiositas nihil recusat. Studia Isabel Moreno Ferrero dicata: estudios dedicados a Isabel Moreno Ferrero. Juan Antonio González Iglesias (ed. lit.), Julián Víctor Méndez Dosuna (ed. lit.), Blanca María Prósper (ed. lit.), 2021. págs. 427-442. . 
 . 
 .
 Untermann, Jürgen (1997): Monumenta Linguarum Hispanicarum. IV Die tartessischen, keltiberischen und lusitanischen Inschriften, Wiesbaden.
 Villar, Francisco (1996): Los indoeuropeos y los orígenes de Europa, Madrid.
 Villar, Francisco; Pedrero Rosa (2001): «La nueva inscripción lusitana: Arroyo de la Luz III», Religión, lengua y cultura prerromanas de Hispania, pp. 663–698.

External links
 Lusitanian in  LINGVÆ·IMPERII (Spanish)
Detailed map of the Pre-Roman Peoples of Iberia (around 200 BC)
Study of the Ribeira da Venda inscription (Portuguese)
What is necessary to decide if Lusitanian is a Celtic language?

Languages of Portugal
Lusitanians
Paleohispanic languages
Extinct languages of Europe
Languages extinct in the 2nd century
Unclassified Indo-European languages
Italo-Celtic
Extinct languages of Spain